The first United States Attorney to serve while Indiana was still a territory was Elijah Sparks in 1813. His successor, William Hendricks, witnessed Indiana's admission to the Union as the 19th state in 1816. On April 21, 1928, the federal district for the State of Indiana was divided into the Northern and Southern Judicial Districts, resulting in the creation of the Office of the United States Attorney for the Northern District of Indiana. The Northern District of Indiana consists of the northern 32 counties of the State of Indiana. The district has three staffed offices in Hammond, South Bend and Fort Wayne. By contrast, the State of Indiana has 92 prosecuting attorneys located in each county seat.

The Hammond Division covers Lake and Porter Counties. The South Bend Division covers Cass, Elkhart, Fulton, Kosciusko, LaPorte, Marshall, Miami, Pulaski, St. Joseph, Starke, and Wabash Counties. The Fort Wayne Division covers Adams, Allen, Blackford, Dekalb, Grant, Huntington, Jay, Lagrange, Noble, Steuben, Wells, and Whitley Counties. The Northern District of Indiana also includes the Hammond Division at Lafayette which covers Benton, Carroll, Jasper, Newton, Tippecanoe, Warren, and White Counties.

Joseph S. Van Bokkelen was appointed by President George W. Bush as the 17th United States Attorney for the Northern District of Indiana on September 21, 2001. Van Bokkelen was then appointed a federal judge in 2007. David Capp was appointed Acting United States Attorney for the Northern District of Indiana on July 20, 2007. Prior to his appointment as Acting United States Attorney, he served as the First Assistant U.S. Attorney since 1991, and as federal prosecutor since 1985.

David A. Capp was nominated for United States Attorney on December 23, 2009, confirmed by the Senate on April 22, 2010, and sworn in by Chief Judge Philip Simon as the United States Attorney on April 28, 2010. Prior to that, he served as interim United States Attorney on three occasions. Capp joined the United States Attorney's Office in 1985. From 1991- 2007, he served as the First Assistant, responsible for the day-to-day operations of the office.

List of U.S. Attorneys since 1928

References

External links 
United States Attorney for the Northern District of Indiana

United States Attorneys for the Northern District of Indiana